Phoolan Devi is a Bengali action movie of 1985 directed by Ashok Roy and produced by Rajeev Kaul. This movie was loosely based on the life of Indian bandit turned politician Smt. Phoolan Devi. The film was also released in Hindi with the name Kahani Phoolvati Ki'. Popular hero of the Bollywood movies, Joy Mukherjee played the role of main antagonist in this film.

Plot 
Young Phoolan was forced to marry an old man Puttilal by her parents. Puttilal has another wife who started torture to Phoolan. One day Phoolan met with her close friend Meena who turned into bandit due to atrocities of Thakur brothers. Those Thakur brother, Bara Thakur and Chota Thakur terrorize the villagers. Bikram Mallah, a trusted hand of Thakurs protests such inhuman activities of them. Whilst those brothers attack on Phoolan, Bikram stops them and took charge of the Thakur's gang forcefully. Subsequently, he married Phoolan. Thakur brothers took revenge to kill Bikram and raped Phoolan. They tagged her mercilessly and few villagers gang raped her in all day long. Escaping from their hand Phoolan made her own gang and became Dakait (Decoit) leader. Thereafter she killed all the rapists one by one including two Thakur brothers.

Cast 
 Rita Bhaduri as Phoolan Devi
 Suresh Oberoi as Bikram Mallah
 Joy Mukherjee as Bada Thakur
 Prema Narayan as Meena
 Goga Kapoor as Meena's Husband / Police Informer
 Asit Kumar Sen
 Manik Dutt
 Tarun Ghosh

References 

1985 films
Bengali-language Indian films
Indian action drama films
1980s Bengali-language films
1980s feminist films
Indian films based on actual events
Films about real people
Indian biographical drama films
Indian crime drama films
Indian feminist films
Films about organised crime in India
Films about rape in India
Indian rape and revenge films
Films about the caste system in India
Films about women in India
Cultural depictions of robbers
Cultural depictions of Indian women
Films about outlaws
Indian films about revenge
1980s action drama films
1980s biographical drama films
1985 crime drama films

External links